The  Joshua Creek Canyon Ecological Reserve in Big Sur, California, is owned by to the California Department of Fish and Wildlife. It is located between Big Sur Coast Highway to the west, Palo Corona Regional Park on the north, and Santa Lucia Preserve and U.S. Forest Service land to the east.

All ecological reserves are maintained for the primary purpose of developing a statewide program for protection of rare, threatened, or endangered native plants, wildlife, aquatic organisms, and specialized terrestrial or aquatic habitat types. Visitors are required to obtain "Daily or Annual Lands Pass for Authorized Uses other than Hunting".

References 

Big Sur
Monterey County, California
Protected areas of Monterey County, California